These are the official results of the Women's Heptathlon competition at the 1995 World Championships in Gothenburg, Sweden. With a total of 30 participating athletes, including 10 non-finishers, this edition of the women's heptathlon is notable for having the highest fraction of athletes not finishing the competition in the World Championships history. The competition started on August 9, 1995, and ended on August 10, 1995.

Medalists

Schedule

Wednesday, August 9, 1995

Thursday, August 10, 1995

Records

Results

See also
 1995 Hypo-Meeting

References
 Results
 IAAF Statistics Handbook Daegu 2011, Part 3 of 5, Pages 264, 265

H
Heptathlon at the World Athletics Championships
1995 in women's athletics